Meisertown is an unincorporated community in Pocono Township in Monroe County, Pennsylvania, United States. Meisertown is located at the intersection of state routes 314 and 715.

References

Unincorporated communities in Monroe County, Pennsylvania
Unincorporated communities in Pennsylvania